The House of Ardenne (or Ardennes, French Maison d'Ardenne) was an important medieval noble family from Lotharingia, known from at least the tenth century. They had several important branches, descended from several brothers: 
The House of Ardenne–Verdun, with several Dukes of Lower Lotharingia, descended from Count Gozelin.
The House of Ardenne–Bar, with several Dukes of Upper Lotharingia, descended from Frederick I, Duke of Upper Lorraine.
The House of Ardenne–Luxembourg, descended from Count Sigfried.

All members descended from Cunigunda of France, a granddaughter of the West Frankish king Louis the Stammerer. She married twice but all or most of her children were children of her first husband, Count Palatine Wigeric of Lotharingia.

References

House of Ardennes
Lorraine noble families
Dukes of Lorraine